Paul Herman Buck (August 25, 1899 – December 23, 1978) was an American historian. He won the Pulitzer Prize for History in 1938 and became the first Provost of Harvard University in 1945.

Biography
Buck was born in Ohio.  He received a Bachelor's degree (1921) and an MA (1922) from Ohio State University.  While an undergraduate, Buck was initiated into the Kappa Sigma fraternity.  In 1922 he published his first book Evolution of the National Parks System. He went to Harvard University for his graduate studies, and received a Master's degree in 1924. After studying for one year in Britain and France under a Sheldon traveling fellowship, he joined Harvard as an instructor in history in 1926. He received a PhD degree from Harvard in 1935, and in 1936 he became assistant professor of American history at Harvard. He was appointed Associate Dean of Faculty in 1938, Associate Professor in 1939, and Dean of Faculty in 1942 at Harvard. On October 15, 1945, he became Harvard's first Provost (until 1953).  In 1955 he became Francis Lee Higginson Professor of History, followed in 1958 by Carl H. Pforzheimer University Professor.  In 1955-64 he became director of the university's library.

He died in 1978.

Pulitzer Prize and other work on history
While he was a history professor at Harvard, Buck was involved in extensive research at the university library and other libraries in the American East and Southeast which resulted in his study of the Reconstruction era. in the American South.  Buck won the 1938 Pulitzer Prize for History for The Road to Reunion, 1865-1900 (1937), about the history of politics and government during this era.

He also published The Role of Education in American History in 1957, and Libraries & Universities: Addresses and Reports in 1964.

References
Notes

Bibliography

External links
 Oral history interview transcript for Paul Herman on 2 March 1977, American Institute of Physics, Niels Bohr Library & Archives - interview conducted by Katherine Sopka

1899 births
1978 deaths
20th-century American historians
20th-century American male writers
Harvard University alumni
Harvard University faculty
Historians of the American Civil War
Historians of the United States
Ohio State University alumni
Pulitzer Prize for History winners
American male non-fiction writers